This is a list of the men who have served in the capacity of Minister-President or equivalent office in the states within the region of Mecklenburg from the 18th century to 1952. The states in question were Duchy and Grand Duchy of Mecklenburg-Schwerin, Duchy and Grand Duchy of Mecklenburg-Strelitz, Free States of Mecklenburg-Schwerin and Mecklenburg-Strelitz and unified state of Mecklenburg.

In 1990, with German reunification, the state was re-established as Mecklenburg-Vorpommern.

Mecklenburg-Schwerin

Duchy

Prime Ministers
1783–1784: Carl Friedrich Graf von Bassewitz
1784–1800: Stephan Werner von Dewitz auf Cölpin
1800–1808: Bernhard Friedrich Graf von Bassewitz
1808–1815: August Georg Freiherr von Brandenstein

Grand Duchy
Prime Ministers
1815–1836: August Georg Freiherr von Brandenstein
1836–1837: Leopold Engelke von Plessen
1837–1840: Christian Friedrich Krüger
1840–1850: Ludwig von Lützow

Presidents of the State Ministry
1850–1858: Hans Adolf Karl Graf von Bülow
1858–1869: Jasper Joachim Bernhard Wilhelm von Oertzen
1869–1885: Henning Carl Friedrich Graf von Bassewitz
1886–1901: Alexander Friedrich Wilhelm von Bülow
1901–1914: Karl Heinrich Ludwig Graf von Bassewitz-Levetzow
1914–1918: Adolf Ferdinand Helmut August Wilhelm Langfeld

Free State
Political Party:

Mecklenburg-Strelitz

Duchy (1769–1815) 
Ministers of State (Staatsminister)
1769–1784: Stephan Werner von Dewitz auf Cöpin
1784–1795: Christoph Otto von Gamm
1795–1800: Otto Ulrich von Dewitz
1800–1815: Karl Wilhelm Friedrich David von Pentz

Grand Duchy (1815–1918) 
1815–1827: Karl Wilhelm Friedrich David von Pentz
1827–1836: August Otto Ernst Freiherr von Örtzen auf Klokow
1837–1848: Otto Ludwig Christian von Dewitz auf Sallnow
1848–1850: Vacant
1850–1861: August Ludwig Wilhelm von Bernstorff
1862–1868: Bernhard Ernst von Bülow
1868–1872: Wilhelm Karl Konrad Freiherr von Hammerstein-Loxten
1872–1885: Anton von Piper (acting)
1885–1907: Friedrich Wilhelm Otto Ulrich Karl Helmut von Dewitz
1907–1918: Heinrich Bossart

Free State (1918-1933) 
Political Party:

Mecklenburg (1933–1952)

Nazi Germany (1933–1945) 
 Reichsstatthalter of the State of Mecklenburg

 Minister-President of the State of Mecklenburg

Soviet control / GDR (1945–1952) 
 Minister-President of the State of Mecklenburg
Political Party:

Mecklenburg-Vorpommern (1990–present) 
The Minister-President of Mecklenburg-Vorpommern, is the head of government of the German state of Mecklenburg-Vorpommern. The position was created in 1990 after German reunification. The former districts Rostock, Schwerin, Neubrandenburg and the northern part of Potsdam were merged into the new federal state of Mecklenburg-Vorpommern and the borders was redrawn.

The current and first female Minister-President is Manuela Schwesig, since 2021 heading a coalition government between the Social Democrats and The Left. Schwesig succeeded Erwin Sellering in July 2017.

The office of the Minister-President is known as the State Chancellery, and is located in the capital of Schwerin, along with the rest of the cabinet departments.
 Minister-President of Mecklenburg-Vorpommern
Political Party:

See also
List of Ministers-President of Mecklenburg-Vorpommern

References

External links
Worldstatesmen.org – Duchy and Grand Duchy of Mecklenburg-Schwerin, Duchy and Grand Duchy of Mecklenburg-Strelitz, Free State of Mecklenburg-Schwerin, Free State of Mecklenburg-Strelitz and Mecklenburg

Ministers-President
Mecklenburg
Ministers-President of Mecklenburg